Microseris walteri is an Australian perennial herb with yellow flowers and edible tuberous roots, and one of three plants known as murnong or yam daisy along with Microseris scapigera and Microseris lanceolata. 

The plant is found in southern parts of Australia, including Victoria, NSW, ACT, SA, WA and Tasmania. In Victoria, the plant is widespread and occupying a wide range of habitats, particularly dry open forest.

Botanical naming 

For more than 30 years Murnong was named as Microseris sp. or Microseris lanceolata or Microseris scapigera. Royal Botanic Gardens Victoria botanist Neville Walsh clarified the botanical name of Microseris walteri in 2016 and defined the differences in the three species in the table below.

Biological descriptions
Microseris walteri has the form of a tufted rosette of toothed lanceolate leaves.

The flower appears in Spring, which is a yellow head of florets, similar to flatweed (Hypochaeris radicata) or dandelion (Taraxacum). The flower stalk is pendulous before flowering, becoming erect for flowering to attract pollinators and again with the ripening of the seed head. The seed heads ripen to a cluster of fluffy, tan achenes, each having a crown of fine extensions called a pappus. The seeds are dispersed by wind. 

The plant usually grows a single tuber each season. There is a wide variation in shape and size of tubers between plants from different habitats in the Victoria. Those from northwest Victoria have probably the longest tubers. A rare form from the volcanic plain (Woorndoo area) has a stocky, sometimes few-branched, but apparently perennial tap-root.

Gallery

Cultivation and uses
The edible tuberous roots of murnong plants were once a vitally important source of food for the Indigenous Australians. In the south-eastern parts of Australia, Indigenous women would dig for roots with a digging stick, also known as a yam stick, and they would carry the roots in a dillybag. The practice of digging for tubers and leaving part of the tuber, meant the soil was tilled and caused more plants to grow. Murnong was cooked by placing a dillybag of tubers onto an earth oven for roasting. The taste of the cooked tuber is described as 'sweet with a flavour of coconut'. 

The introduction of cattle, sheep and goats by immigrating early–colonialist Europeans led to the near extinction of murnong, with calamitous results for first Australians' communities who depended upon murnong for a large part of their food.

References

External links 
 Photographs of herbarium type specimens: 
 "Victoria, Sandringham, Sept. 1900, C.Walter s.n." LY 0009479 (type for M. walteri Gand.)
 "W. Australia, J.Drummond 5th Coll., 366" K000796797; West Austr. Maxwell MEL 64832, MEL 64833  (isotypes) (for Microseris forsteri var. subplumosa Benth.) 

walteri
Asterales of Australia
Flora of Victoria (Australia)
Herbs
Root vegetables
Plants described in 1840